Coulee is an unincorporated community in Mountrail County, North Dakota, United States, on the border of Ward County.

It is the location of Our Savior's Scandinavian Lutheran Church, which is listed on the U.S. National Register of Historic Places.

References

Unincorporated communities in Mountrail County, North Dakota
Unincorporated communities in North Dakota